Wang Yi (Chinese: 王毅; born 22 August 1990 in Dalian) is a Chinese football player who currently plays for China League One side Nanjing City.

Club career
In 2008, Wang Yi started his professional footballer career with Chengdu Tiancheng in the Chinese Super League. To gain some playing time he was loaned out to the clubs satellite team, Sheffield United HK where he made his debut in a league game against Convoy Sun Hei on 10 September 2008 in a 0-0 draw. On his return he would be promoted to the clubs first choice goalkeeper by the new Head coach Lawrie McKinna half way through the 2011 Chinese Super League season to help the club avoid relegation. Wang would make his league debut for Chengdu on 13 August 2011 in a league game against Tianjin Teda that ended in a 1-1 draw. While there was an upswing in results, Wang was still unable help the club avoid relegation at the end season. 

In the 2012 China League One season Zhang Chen was brought in to compete for the first choice goalkeeping position. Wang remained with the club until the end of the 2014 China League One season the club experienced another relegation and were dissolved due to wage arrears. In February 2015, Wang transferred to China League One side Wuhan Zall. After two season, on 1 January 2017, Wang was signed by his hometown club Dalian Transcendence.

Career statistics 
Statistics accurate as of match played 31 December 2020.

References

External links
Wang Yi at Soccerway.com

1990 births
Living people
Chinese footballers
Footballers from Dalian
Chengdu Tiancheng F.C. players
Wuhan F.C. players
Dalian Transcendence F.C. players
Chinese Super League players
China League One players
Association football goalkeepers